¡Buenísimo, Natacha! is an Argentine children's book by Luis Pescetti, an argentine writer and singer. It was first published in 2002. It is the fourth book of a children's literature series about a little girl called Natacha and her experiences.

The first edition with illustrations from O'Kif was published by argentine publisher Alfaguara in 2002 in Buenos Aires. A second edition illustrated by Pablo Fernández came out in 2008 in celebration of the ten year anniversary of the first book of the series "Natacha".

The CD "Antología de Luis Pescetti" contains two chapters of this book: Novios (Boyfriend and girlfriend) and Escribiendo la famosa carta (Writing the famous letter).

Synopsis 
The book includes a series of independent stories based on the central plot that revolves around Natacha and Pati's idea to write love letters as a service for their schoolmates. These stories are mixed with the events of Natacha and her classmates doing homework for their school's science fair.

Books in the same series are:

Natacha (novel)
La tarea según Natacha
¡Buenísimo, Natacha! 
Chat, Natacha, chat 
Bituín bituín Natacha 
Querido diario (Natacha) 
La enciclopedia de las Chicas Perla 
Te amo, lectura (Natacha) 
Nuestro planeta, Natacha

References

Books by Luis Pescetti
2002 Argentine novels
2002 children's books
Alfaguara books